A list of windmills in Charente-Maritime, France

External links
French windmills website

Windmills in France
Charente-Maritime
Buildings and structures in Charente-Maritime